Wes Suter is a retired American gymnast who competed in the 1988 Olympics.

Suter was a highly decorated high school gymnast in Virginia in the early 80s.  Describing Suter's intensity, his coach Bob Grauman remarked:

I have never in all of my years of coaching, and I coached for 32 years, have never met an individual with fire in the belly to perform at a high level.  Whether it was practice, warm-ups or a meet, he had that killer instinct and wanted to win.

Suter went on to compete at the University of Nebraska, where he was part of the 1983 National Champion team.  In 1985, he was the NCAA all-around champion and also won gold on high bar and floor.  Suter was awarded the Nissen Award (the "Heisman" of gymnastics) in 1986.

Suter's younger brother Richard was also a competitive gymnast.

References

1964 births
Living people
American male artistic gymnasts
Gymnasts at the 1988 Summer Olympics
Nebraska Cornhuskers men's gymnasts
Olympic gymnasts of the United States